Kursum Mosque (from Turkish kurşun, "leaden") can refer to:
 Kursum Mosque, Karlovo, Bulgaria
 Kursum Mosque, Trikala, Greece